Phedimus is a genus of the succulent family Crassulaceae (stonecrop family), with about 18 species, distributed in eastern Europe and Asia. The genus is described with two subgenera, but one of these is also recognized as a separate genus, Aizopsis. Phedimus kamtschaticus (syn. Sedum kamtschaticum) is widely grown as an ornamental ground cover and has gained the Royal Horticultural Society's Award of Garden Merit.

Description
Species are perennial or rarely annual herbs, usually glabrous stems, sometimes woody at base, from thin woody rhizome. Leaves decussate or alternate, with narrow base, and several hydathodes on lower face along margins. The flowering branches are erect or descending, with dense inflorescences exhibiting many flowered terminal pleiochasia (several buds come out at the same time). Flowers 4-7 parts, sepals usually unequal, petals free, usually spreading. The fruits are follicles, usually spreading and seeds costate-papillate (incompletely connate), but multipapillate in Phedimus selskianus.

When treated as Phedimus sensu lato, i.e. including Aizopsis, subgenus Phedimus (Phedimus sensu strictu) has creeping and rooting stems, flowers white, pink, red or purplish and chromosome numbers x=5,6,7, while subgenus Aizoon has annual shoots often woody at base, emerging from woody rhizomes, flowers yellow, orange or reddish and x=8.

Taxonomy
Phedimus is a genus in the family Crassulaceae, subfamily Sempervivoideae, tribe Umbiliceae, together with three other genera. It was segregated from the very large cosmopolitan and polyphyletic genus, Sedum, where it was variously considered a section or subgenus. Within the tribe it is a sister group to Aizopsis. There, it is distinguished by flower colouration (pink or white flowers compared to the yellow flowers of Aizopsis), floral morphology, distribution (Eurasia vs. Asia) and chromosome numbers (x=14 vs. 16). Some authors include Aizopsis as a subgenus:
 Phedimus subgenus Phedimus c. 5 species
 Phedimus subgenus Aizoon c. 13 species

Distribution
Subgenus Phedimus Mediterranean to Caucasus. Subgenus Aizoon China, Japan, Korea and central Siberia.

References

Bibliography

  (full text at ResearchGate)
 
 
 

Crassulaceae
Crassulaceae genera
Taxa named by Constantine Samuel Rafinesque